Farpoint is a virtual reality first-person shooter video game developed by Impulse Gear and published by Sony Interactive Entertainment. It was released on the PlayStation 4 on May 16, 2017, and received mostly positive reviews.

Gameplay

Farpoint is a virtual reality space adventure set on a hostile alien planet. It can be played with the PS VR Aim Controller. It also features online cooperative play, and includes a single-player campaign.

Development

Farpoint was announced at E3 2016. It was developed by San Francisco-based developer Impulse Gear. A downloadable expansion called Cryo Pack was released on June 27, which featured new maps and levels. A second downloadable content pack called Versus Expansion Pack was released on December 5, which featured two new PvP modes, three new player skins and 15 new weapons, in addition to a progressive XP system.

Reception
Farpoint received generally positive reviews and has a score of 71% on Metacritic.

IGN awarded it a score of 7.5 out of 10, saying "Fantastic gunplay and freedom of movement sets PSVR's Farpoint apart from most VR shooting galleries." GameSpot awarded it 7 out of 10, saying "Despite shifting gears in surprising ways and extending the life of its gunplay by remixing levels, Farpoint is more like a proof of concept than a game designed to push the envelope on its own terms." Game Informer also awarded it 7 out of 10, saying "Farpoint may not move the needle as a shooter, but it’s a sound VR experience." Destructoid similarly awarded it 7 out of 10, and said "the biggest problem is that all of these technical advancements aren't backed up by a setting that does it justice."

Farpoint sold 17,100 copies within its first week on sale in Japan. It debuted at number two on the UK sales charts, and was the highest-charting VR-required game in the UK.

Accolades
The game won both the PlayStation VR Award at the PlayStation Awards 2017, and the PlayStation VR Game of the Year award at the Road to VR's 2017 Game of the Year Awards.  It was also nominated for "Best PS VR Experience" at PlayStation Blog's Game of the Year Awards.

References

2017 video games
PlayStation 4 games
PlayStation 4-only games
PlayStation VR games
Sony Interactive Entertainment games
Video games about extraterrestrial life
Video games developed in the United States
Video games set on fictional planets
PlayStation 4 Pro enhanced games